"Breathing" is a song by American alternative rock band Lifehouse. It is the third single released from their debut studio album No Name Face (2000).

Background, release and composition
The song was written by Lifehouse lead singer Jason Wade and produced by American record producer Ron Aniello. When asked about his expectations of writings songs in an interview with Billboard, Wade said, "My ultimate goal in writing songs is to connect with people. In the lyrics, you don't tell the whole picture: You give a road to start on that people can relate to. We're honest, nice guys and I hope that comes across in everything we do." The song was released on March 19, 2002 by DreamWorks Records.

"Breathing" was described as a pop rock song that contains adult alternative. According to the sheet music published at Musicnotes.com by Sony/ATV Music Publishing, the song is set in common time with a slow tempo of 76 beats per minute. It is composed in the key of D minor with Wade's vocal range spanning from the low-note of A3 to the high-note of E5. The song has a basic chord progression of Am–G2–F2–G2. Dave Urbanski of Today's Christian Music questioned whether the lyrics "I’m trying to identify the voices in my head / God, which one’s you..." were about God or a girl, but applauded their "skillful musicianship" and "poetic insight". John DiBiase of Jesus Freak Hideout said that the song has catchy rock, but noted how it "tends to find itself getting a little monotonous at times."

Chart performance
"Breathing" had limited commercial success and debuted on the Billboard Adult Pop Songs chart at number 39 for the week of November 10, 2001. It stayed at number 39 the following week, and went up to 37 during the week of November 24, 2001. In its fourth week on the chart, the track climbed to number 36, while it went up to 35 for the week of December 8, 2001. The track then climbed to number 35 and 32 for the weeks of December 15, 2001, and December 22, 2001, respectively. The song then finished 2001 at number 27 for the week of December 29, 2001. For the week of January 12, 2002, the song went up the chart to number 25, while it went up to 24 the following week. "Breathing" then went up to 23 during the week of January 26, 2002 and up to 21 for the week of February 9, 2002. It eventually peaked at number 19 on the chart during the week of February 23, 2002.

Credits and personnel
 Songwriting – Jason Wade
 Production – Ron Aniello
 Mixing – Brendan O'Brien
 Engineering – Bob Kearny, Marc Green, Paul Hayden

Credits and personnel adapted from Allmusic.

Track listing
"Breathing" (Rock Remix) - 4:11 (Jason Wade)

Australian CD-Single
 LP Radio Edit - 4:09
 Radio Remix - 4:11

Charts

References

2001 singles
Lifehouse (band) songs
Songs written by Jason Wade
Song recordings produced by Ron Aniello
2000 songs
DreamWorks Records singles
Alternative rock ballads